R-123 "Magnolia" (Р-123 «Магнолия») is a Soviet military HF/VHF radio transceiver designed for use in tanks and other armoured vehicles. The device was made in the Ryazan radio plant.

Deployment
The R-123 set was commonly used in conjunction with the R-124 intercom system in armoured vehicles. Introduced in the early 1960s, the R-123 set was also adopted by other Warsaw Pact members and exported to countries such as Finland, Egypt, and Iraq.

Technical specifications

R-123
FM, superheterodyne radio transceiver. Circuitry consists of 32 valves and various semiconductor devices.
Tuning system: In addition to manual tuning, up to 4 preset channels can be selected using a motorized servo system.
Frequency range:	
Band 1 = 20.00 - 35.75 MHz
Band 2 = 35.75 - 51.50 MHz
Channel spacing: 25 kHz 
1,260 total available channels 
Transmitter power: 20 W 
Range: 20 km 
Antennas:
Tank rod antenna: 4 m
Telescopic antenna: 6 m
Operating temperature range: -40 to +50 °C
Dimensions: 428 × 225 × 178 mm
Weight: 25 kg

BP-26 power supply unit  
Transistorized inverter
Input voltage: 26 V 
Output voltages: + 1.2 V, + 6.3 V, + 150 V, - 150 V, + 250 V and + 600 V 
Dimensions: 210 × 164 × 218 mm
Weight: 7 kg

References

External links 
https://www.radiomuseum.org/r/riazan_magnolia_r_123r_12p_12.html

Military electronics of Russia
Military radio systems
Radio in the Soviet Union
Military equipment introduced in the 1960s